Jose Elcius (born 6 November 2000) is a Turks and Caicos Islander professional footballer who plays for AFC Academy and the Turks and Caicos Islands national team.

International career
At the youth level, Elcius capped with the Turks and Caicos Islands U20s.

He made his senior international debut on 22 March 2018 in a 4–0 friendly defeat to Dominica. On 14 November 2019, Elcius scored his first goal for Turks and Caicos Islands against non-FIFA member Sint Maarten in a 3–2 victory in the CONCACAF Nations League.

References

External links
 

2000 births
Living people
Association football midfielders
Turks and Caicos Islands footballers
Turks and Caicos Islands international footballers
Turks and Caicos Islands under-20 international footballers
AFC Academy players